Bons Baisers de Hong Kong (also known as From Hong Kong with Love) is a 1975 French spy comedy film directed by Yvan Chiffre.

It is a parody and spin-off of the James Bond film series starring Les Charlots, with Mickey Rooney portraying the antagonist. Bernard Lee and Lois Maxwell make cameos in their roles as M and Miss Moneypenny (though the characters remain unnamed). Part of the picture was filmed at the Shaw Brothers studios in Hong Kong. Besides the James Bond series, the film also parodies Hong Kong martial arts films.

Synopsis
The film starts with James Bond being shot and killed during in a parody of the James Bond gun barrel sequence.  Queen Elizabeth II (Huguette Funfrock) is then kidnapped by a wealthy American megalomaniac (Mickey Rooney). Since their best agent is dead, the British secret services ask for help from their French counterparts, the SDECE. The Les Charlots group are tasked with hiding the queen's disappearance while the investigation continues to Spain, then to Hong Kong. In the meantime, a parisian concierge, who is a dead ringer for Elizabeth II, impersonates the Queen in public.

Cast

References

External links
 

French spy comedy films
1975 films
1970s spy comedy films
Parody films based on James Bond films
French parody films
Films shot in Hong Kong
1970s parody films
1975 comedy films
1970s martial arts comedy films
1970s French films